Bielsko-Biała is a city in southern Poland, with a population of approximately 168,319 as of December 2021, making it the 22nd largest city in Poland, and an area of . It is a centre of the Bielsko Urban Agglomeration with 325,000 inhabitants and is an administrative, automotive, education, transport, and tourism hub of Podbeskiedzie Region as well as the Bielsko Industrial Region. It serves as the seat of the Bielsko County, Euroregion Beskydy, Roman Catholic Diocese of Bielsko–Żywiec and the Evangelical Church Diocese of Cieszyn.

Situated north of the Beskid Mountains, Bielsko-Biała is composed of two former towns which merged in 1951 – Bielsko in the west and Biała in the east – on opposite banks of the Biała River that once divided Silesia and Lesser Poland. Between 1975 and 1998, the city was the seat of Bielsko Voivodeship and currently lies within the Silesian Voivodeship. The city is currently subdivided into 12 districts and is a member of the Association of Polish Cities (Związek Miast Polskich).

History

Both city names, Bielsko and Biała refer to the Biała River, with etymology stemming from either biel or biała, which means "white" in Polish.

Bielsko

The remnants of a fortified settlement in what is now the Stare Bielsko (Old Bielsko) district of the city were discovered between 1933 and 1938 by a Polish archaeological team. The settlement was dated to the 12th – 14th centuries. Its dwellers manufactured iron from ore and specialized in smithery. The current centre of the town was probably developed as early as the first half of the 13th century. At that time a castle (which still survives today) was built on a hill.

In the second half of the 13th century, the Piast dukes of Opole invited German settlers to colonize the Silesian Foothills. As the dukes then also ruled over the Lesser Poland lands east of the Biała River, settlements arose on both banks like Bielitz (now Stare Bielsko), Nickelsdorf (Mikuszowice Śląskie), Kamitz (Kamienica), Batzdorf (Komorowice Śląskie) and Kurzwald in the west as well as Kunzendorf (Lipnik), Alzen (Hałcnów) and Wilmesau (Wilamowice) in the east. Nearby settlements in the mountains were Lobnitz (Wapienica) and Bistrai (Bystra).

After the partition of the Duchy of Opole in 1281, Bielsko passed to the Dukes of Cieszyn within fragmented Poland. The town was first documented in 1312 when Duke Mieszko I of Cieszyn granted a town charter. The Biała again became a border river, when in 1315 the eastern Duchy of Oświęcim split off from Cieszyn as a separate under Mieszko's son Władysław. After the Dukes of Cieszyn had become vassals of the Bohemian kings in 1327 and the Duchy of Oświęcim was sold to the Polish Crown in 1457, returning to Lesser Poland after three centuries, the Biała River for next centuries marked the border between the Bohemian crown land of Silesia within the Holy Roman Empire and the Lesser Poland Province of the Kingdom of Poland and the Polish–Lithuanian Commonwealth.

With Bohemia and the Upper Silesian Duchy of Cieszyn, Bielsko in 1526 was inherited by the Austrian House of Habsburg and incorporated into the Habsburg monarchy. From 1560 Bielsko was held by Frederick Casimir of Cieszyn, son of Duke Wenceslaus III Adam, who due to the enormous debts his son left upon his death in 1571, had to sell it to the Promnitz noble family at Pless. With the consent of Emperor Maximilian II, the Promnitz dynasty and their Schaffgotsch successors ruled the Duchy of Bielsko as a Bohemian state country; acquired by the Austrian chancellor Count Friedrich Wilhelm von Haugwitz in 1743, and afterwards by Polish aristocrat Aleksander Józef Sułkowski in 1752, the ducal status was finally confirmed by Empress Maria Theresa in 1754. It remained in possession of the Polish Sułkowski family until the dissolution of the duchy in 1849, while the castle was still owned by the Sułkowskis until World War II.

After the Prussian king Frederick the Great had invaded Silesia, Bielsko remained with the Habsburg monarchy as part of Austrian Silesia according to the 1742 Treaty of Breslau.

In late 1849 Bielsko became a seat of political district. In 1870 it became a statutory city.

Biała

The opposite bank of the Biała River, again Polish since 1454, had been sparsely settled since the mid-16th century. A locality was first mentioned in a 1564 deed, it received the name Biała in 1584, and belonged at that time to Kraków Voivodeship. Its population increased during the Counter-Reformation in the Habsburg lands, when many Protestant artisans from Bielsko moved across the river. Though already named a town in the 17th century, Biała officially was granted city rights by the Polish king Augustus II the Strong in 1723.

In the course of the First Partition of Poland in 1772, Biała was annexed by the Austrian Habsburg Monarchy and incorporated into the crownland of Galicia. The Protestant citizens received the right to establish parishes according to the 1781 Patent of Toleration by Emperor Joseph II. Biala was head of the district with the same name, one of the 78 Bezirkshauptmannschaften in the Galicia crownland.

Modern times

Although separate, the two cities effectively functioned as one urban area known as Bielsko-Biała since the 19th century. With the dissolution of Austria-Hungary in 1918 according to the Treaty of Saint-Germain-en-Laye, both cities became part of the reconstituted Polish state, although the majority of the population was German, forming a German language island.

Some ethnic German citizens formed an anti-Polish, anti-Jewish Jungdeutsche Partei, supported financially by the Foreign Ministry of Nazi Germany. Its members smuggled weapons and waged a campaign of intimidating other German residents to leave for Germany. A considerable number of young Germans joined  this Party during the mid-1930s.

During the German invasion of Poland, which started World War II, the Einsatzgruppe I entered Bielsko-Biała in the first half of September 1939 to torture, plunder, and murder Jews. During the war Bielsko-Biała was annexed and occupied by Nazi Germany. In 1939 Germans arrested several Polish teachers and principals who were then deported to Nazi concentration camps and murdered there. A prison for Poles was operated by the Germans in Bielsko-Biała. Many of its Jewish residents were murdered at the nearby Auschwitz extermination camp. Less than 1000 of Bielsko-Biała's Jewish community of nearly 8000 survived the war.  After the defeat of Nazi Germany in 1945, the remaining German population fled westward or were expelled. The town was polonized and gradually repopulated by Polish settlers.

Several widely known Holocaust survivors from Bielsko-Biała were Roman Frister, Gerda Weissmann Klein and Kitty Hart-Moxon, all of whom wrote accounts of their experiences during World War II.

The combined city of Bielsko-Biała was created administratively on 1 January 1951 when the two cities of Bielsko, and Biała (known until 1951 as Biała Krakowska), were unified.

Geography
Administrated within Silesian Voivodeship since 1999, the city was previously capital of Bielsko-Biała Voivodeship (1975–1998).

Bielsko-Biała is one of the most important cities of the Beskidy Euroregion and the main city of the Bielsko Industrial Region, part of the Upper Silesian metropolitan area.

Climate
Bielsko-Biała has an oceanic climate (Köppen :Cfb) with cold, damp winters and warm, wet summers. However, using the 0 °C isotherm, the climate is a Dfb-type called of humid continental climate, which explains its considerable thermal amplitude for Central Europe. The extremes may still be moderated by the western patterns and winds of this direction, which still maintains hybrid characteristics in the city's climate. Foëhn winds help maintain a milder winter in Bielsko-Biała and average about 4 °C lower than the surrounding mountains each year. The sunniest days are between late summer and early fall, with a few months reaching 9 sunny days. In the 1960s 55 cm of snow cover was recorded.

Economy and industry

Bielsko-Biała is one of the most business friendly medium size cities in Poland. In the 2014 ranking of the 'Most Attractive Cities for Business' published yearly by Forbes the city was ranked 3rd in the category of cities with 150,000–300,000 inhabitants. About 2% of people are unemployed (compared to 5.8% for Poland).

Bielsko-Biała is known for its textile, machine-building, and especially automotive industry. FCA Poland, a subsidiary of Stellantis, has a car factory based in the city. Four areas in the city belong to the Katowice Special Economic Zone. The city region is a home for several manufacturers of high-performance gliders and aircraft including Margański & Mysłowski, a local producer and designer of business long range small aircraft.
 The labor market in the city shows deficits in the workforce in such professions as: construction workers, operators of construction machines, electricians, electromechanics, dressmakers, couriers.

Transport

Road transport
Bielsko-Biała is located within a short distance to Czech and Slovakian borders on the crossroads of two Expressways (S1 and S52) connecting Poland with Southern Europe:
Expressway S1 connects the city with Slovakia via the border town Zwardoń.
Expressway S52 connects the city with the Czech Republic via the border town Cieszyn.
Bielsko-Biała is connected with the rest of Poland by the dual carriageway DK1 road running to Tychy where it intersects the Expressway S1 and further to Katowice where it intersects the Motorway A4.

It is planned to extend S1 north along the existing dual carriageway DK1 from Bielsko-Biała to Tychy and Katowice, thus building an expressway connection of the city with the national motorway network of Poland. National Road DK52 connects Bielsko-Biała with Kraków in the east. The most important interchange in the area is the cloverleaf north of Bielsko-Biała where S1, DK1 and S52 meet.

Voivodeship roads nr. 940 and 942 pass through the city.

Rail transport
Bielsko-Biała is connected by direct train services with the following large Polish cities (November 2014):
Bydgoszcz, Gdańsk, Gdynia, Katowice, Kraków, Łódź, Olsztyn, Opole, Poznań, Szczecin, Toruń, Warszawa (Warsaw), Wrocław.

Airports
There are 3 international airports within the 90 km distance from Bielsko-Biała, all serving connections with major European cities:
Katowice International Airport, Kraków John Paul II International Airport, Ostrava Leoš Janáček Airport.

Sights

Bielsko-Biała is known for its Art Nouveau architecture and is often referred to as  Little Vienna . Sights include: 
 The Bielsko-Biała Museum, housed in the castle of the Dukes of Cieszyn from 15th century, later Castle of the Sułkowski princes
  built in 1897
 Ulica 11 Listopada ("November 11 Street"), the main pedestrian zone of the city center
 Plac Bolesława Chrobrego ("Bolesław the Brave Square"), the main square in the city center
 Frog House (Kamienica Pod Żabami), an Art Nouveau mansion
 The only statue of Martin Luther in Poland. 
  built in 1888
 BWA Bielsko-Biała Gallery of Art
 St. Nicholas Cathedral built in 1447 and rebuilt in 1909–1910
  built in 1890
 , the city's oldest church, built in the Middle Ages in Gothic style
 Jewish Cemetery, founded in 1849
 Weaver's House Museum, Dom Tkacza, reconstructed workshop of a draper
 Museum of Technology and Textile Industry
  mountain located within the city borders and the 
 Dębowiec ski slope

Districts
 Aleksandrowice
 Biała
 Hałcnów
 Kamienica
 Komorowice Śląskie i Komorowice Krakowskie
 Leszczyny
 Lipnik
 Mikuszowice Śląskie and Mikuszowice Krakowskie
 Olszówka Dolna and Olszówka Górna
 Stare Bielsko
 Straconka
 Wapienica

Education
 University of Bielsko-Biała
 
 
 
 
 Wyższa Szkoła Ekonomiczno-Humanistyczna
 Teacher Training College of Bielsko-Biała

Politics
The executive body of the gmina is the President (Mayor) of the City of Bielsko-Biała. This office was created in 1951 when Bielsko and Biała became one city. Previously the city of Bielsko was governed by a President while the city of Biała was governed by a burmistrz. The city is divided into five constituencies during the local elections.

Bielsko-Biała constituency
Senators from Bielsko-Biała constituency:
 Agnieszka Gorgoń-Komor (Civic Platform)

Members of Sejm from Bielsko-Biała constituency:
 Przemysław Drabek (Law and Justice)
 Grzegorz Gaża (Law and Justice)
 Kazimierz Matuszny (Law and Justice)
 Grzegorz Puda (Law and Justice)
 Stanisław Szwed (Law and Justice)
 Mirosława Nykiel (Civic Platform)
 Małgorzata Pępek (Civic Platform)
 Mirosław Suchoń (Poland 2050)
 Przemysław Koperski (New Left)

Municipal politics

Mayor
 Mayor – Jarosław Klimaszewski (PO)
 Deputy Mayor – Przemysław Kamiński
 Deputy Mayor – Adam Ruśniak
 Deputy Mayor – Piotr Kucia

City council
 President of the council – Dorota Piegzik-Izydorczyk (PO)
 Deputy Chairman – Piotr Ryszka (PiS)
 Deputy Chairman – Jacek Krywult (KWW JK)

Sports

The city co-hosted the 1978 UEFA European Under-18 Championship and 2019 FIFA U-20 World Cup.

Major teams and athletes
 TS Podbeskidzie Bielsko-Biała – men's football team playing in the I Liga, Poland's second division.
 BTS Rekord Bielsko-Biała – men's futsal team playing in Polish Futsal Ekstraklasa, Polish Champions 2013/2014, Polish Cup and Supercup winners 2012/2013.
 BKS Stal Bielsko-Biała – women's volleyball team playing in Polish , Polish Champions 1988, 1989, 1990, 1991, 1996, 2003, 2004, 2010; Polish Cup winners 1955, 1979, 1988, 1989, 1990, 2004, 2006, 2009.
 BBTS Siatkarz Original Bielsko-Biała – men's volleyball team playing in Polish Plus Liga.
 KS Sprint – a track and field club based in Bielsko-Biała which organized the international athletics meeting Beskidianathletic.
 Podbeskidzie Kuloodporni Bielsko-Biała – an amputee football club that plays in the Polish Amp Futbol Ekstraklasa.
 Bielsko-Biała Aeroclub – a flying club founded in 1945 based in Bielsko-Biała.
 Sebastian Kawa, member of the local aeroclub, is the eight times World Champion, World's most accomplished glider competition pilot in history, World's (FAI) leading glider competition pilot (currently number two in the world rankings of the FAI Gliding Commission) and the current World Champion in Standard Class and 15m Class.

Notable people

 Adam Broż (born 1935), art historian and journalist
 Heinrich Conried (1855–1909), Austrian theatre director
 Marek Dopierała (born 1960), sprint canoeist, Olympic medallist
 Piotr Fijas (born 1958), ski jumper
 Mateusz Gamrot – mixed martial artist
 Alfred Hetschko (1898–1967), music educator
 Adolf Hyła (1897–1965), painter and art teacher 
 Jolanta Januchta (born 1955), middle-distance runner
 Małgorzata Klimek (born 1957), mathematical physicist
 Jacek Koman (born 1956), actor and singer
 Maria Koterbska (born 1924), singer
 Przemysław Lechowski (born 1977), classical pianist
 Tadeusz Pietrzykowski (1917–1991), boxer and soldier, known as the "boxing champion of Auschwitz"
 Grzegorz Pilarz (born 1980), volleyball player
 Radosław Piwowarski (born 1948), film director, screenwriter and actor
 Jerzy Porębski (born 1957), film producer and screenwriter
 Zbigniew Preisner (born 1955), film score composer
 Renata Przemyk (born 1966), singer and songwriter
 Aneta Sablik (born 1989), singer-songwriter
 Franz Sauer (1894–1962), organist
 Oswald Seeliger (1858–1908), German zoologist
 Kriss Sheridan (born 1989), Polish-American singer, songwriter, actor, model and traveler
 Josef Strzygowski (1862–1941), Polish-Austrian art historian
 Jan Szarek (1936–2020), bishop of the Evangelical-Augsburg Church in Poland
 Sabina Wojtala (born 1981), figure skater
 Jakub Wolny (born 1995), ski jumper
 Aleksander Zawadzki (1798–1868), Polish naturalist
 Emil Zegadłowicz (1888–1941), poet, prose writer, novelist, playwright and translator
 Sigmund Zeisler (1860–1931), German-Jewish lawyer
 Wojciech Zurek (born 1951), theoretical physicist

International relations

Twin towns – sister cities
Bielsko-Biała is twinned with:

  Acre, Israel
  Baia Mare, Romania
  Besançon, France
  Berdyansk, Ukraine

  Frýdek-Místek, Czech Republic
  Grand Rapids, United States
   Kirklees, United Kingdom
  Kragujevac, Serbia
  Nyíregyháza, Hungary
  Szolnok, Hungary
  Tienen, Belgium
  Třinec, Czech Republic
  Ustka, Poland
  Wolfsburg, Germany
  Žilina, Slovakia

See also
 Bielsko-Biała Museum
 Bolek and Lolek
 Jews in Bielsko-Biała
 Sfera shopping mall
 Upper Silesian metropolitan area

References

External links

 Official website
 Bielsko - Aerial photos
  Bielsko-Biała Museum
 Jewish Community of Bielsko-Biała on Virtual Shtetl

 
City counties of Poland
Cities and towns in Silesian Voivodeship
1312 establishments in Europe
Populated places established in 1951
Kraków Voivodeship (14th century – 1795)
Populated places in the Kingdom of Galicia and Lodomeria
Silesian Voivodeship (1920–1939)
Kraków Voivodeship (1919–1939)
Shtetls
Holocaust locations in Poland
14th-century establishments in Poland
Jewish communities destroyed in the Holocaust